No Drama may refer to:
 No Drama (Tinashe song)
 No Drama (Becky G and Ozuna song)
 No Drama, a song by James Hype

See also
Noh, a form of Japanese drama